John Patrick Brasier-Creagh, best known as Patrick Creagh (23 October 1930 - 19 September 2012) was a British poet and translator.

Life
Patrick Creagh was educated at Wellington College and Brasenose College, Oxford. He and his first wife, Lola Segre, lived in Rome until her sudden death in 1960.

Creagh returned to London, losing all his books in transit, but returned to Italy in the late 1960s, travelling with Derek Raymond in an army truck. His second wife Ursula Barr was the ex-wife of Al Alvarez and a granddaughter of D. H. Lawrence's wife. After she inherited the rights to Lady Chatterley's Lover, the pair were able to buy an old farmhouse called Spanda north of Siena.

Creagh met the composer John Eaton while teaching at Princeton University, and wrote several libretti for him.

In the early 1980s Creagh and Barr separated, and Creagh subsequently lived with his partner Susan Rose, née James, at Panzano in Chianti.

Works

Poetry
 Row of Pharaohs, Heinemann, 1962
 A Picture of Tristan: Imitations of Tristan Corbière, 1965.
 Dragon Jack-Knifed, 1966
 To Abel and others, 1970
 The lament of the border-guard, 1980

Translations
 Design as art by Bruno Munari, 1970
 Selected poems by Giuseppe Ungaretti, 1971
 Architecture as environment by Flavio Conti, 1978
 Splendor of the gods by Flavio Giovanni Conti, 1978
 The moral essays by Giacomo Leopardi, 1983
 Danube by Claudio Magris, 1989: winner of the John Florio Prize 1990
 Blind Argus by Gesualdo Bufalino, 1989: winner of the John Florio Prize 1990
 Beautiful Antonio by Vitaliano Brancati, 1993
 The keeper of ruins and other inventions by Gesualdo Bufalino, 1994
 Pereira declares: a testimony by Antonio Tabucchi, 1995
 The chimera by Sebastiano Vassalli, 1995
 The lament of the linnet by Anna Maria Ortese
 The missing head of Damasceno Monteiro by Antonio Tabucchi, 1999
 Tommaso and the blind photographer by Gesualdo Bufalino, 2000
 The Advocate by Marcello Fois, 2001
 Involuntary witness by Gianrico Carofiglio, 2005
 Memory of the Abyss by Marcello Fois 2012: winner of the John Florio Prize 2014

References

1930 births
2012 deaths
Italian–English translators
British male poets
20th-century British poets
20th-century British translators
20th-century British male writers